The Three Californias Trilogy (also known as the Wild Shore Triptych and the Orange County Trilogy) consists of three books by Kim Stanley Robinson, which depict three different possible futures of Orange County, California.  The three books that make up the trilogy are The Wild Shore, The Gold Coast and Pacific Edge.  Each of these books describes the life of young people in the three very different near-futures. All three novels begin with an excavation which tells the reader about the world they are entering.

Summaries

The Wild Shore
The Wild Shore was Robinson's first published novel.
The Wild Shore (1984) is the story of survivors of a nuclear war. The nuclear strike was 2,000 to 3,000 neutron bombs that were detonated in 2,000 of North America's biggest cities in 1987. Survivors have started over, forming little villages and living from agriculture and the sea. The theme of the first chapters is that of a quite normal science fiction pastoral, which is deconstructed in the latter chapters, especially when it becomes clear that the post-nuclear war rural life is hindered from developing further by international treaties imposed by the victorious Soviets, with an unwilling Japan charged with patrolling the West Coast. 

The story is presented as a memoir by Henry "Hank" Fletcher, a teenager living in a town in San Onofre. He accompanies town elder Tom Barnard to visit San Diego, where a larger population is attempting to build a resistance movement against the Japanese. The mayor of San Diego requests the collaboration of San Onofre, but the town assembly votes against it. Hank's best friend, Steve Nicolin, in a rebellious gesture against his overbearing father, pressures Hank and other youngsters to help San Diego. Their only attempt to do this, by ambushing a group of Japanese illegally landing on Dana Point ends in disaster, when they are out-gunned and the San Diego people desert them, which ends with one of Hank's friends dead and Steve running away from San Onofre. Hank falls into a depression, and Tom Barnard suggests he writes down his experiences to try to make sense of them, but he only succeeds partially, and the novel closes with Hank unsure of what his past means to him and what his future will be.

The Wild Shore was nominated for both the Nebula and Philip K. Dick Awards in 1984.
Algis Budrys described it as "a frontier novel, with rich threads of Steinbeckian populism woven into its cast of characters." Although faulting the novel's "failure to sustain the weight of its undertakings," he concluded that Wild Shore was "a remarkably powerful piece of work, still a good book, almost without doubt a harbinger of great books to come from Robinson."

The Gold Coast
In The Gold Coast (1988) we learn about Southern California in 2027, a dystopian extension of the 1980s' Los Angeles and car oriented culture and life-style: "an endless sprawl of condos, freeways and malls."  The book follows two groups of characters, connected by 27 year-old Jim McPherson and his father Dennis. Dennis works as an engineer for Laguna Space Research (LSR), an aerospace company caught in the power struggles of the armed forces, where he's put in charge of fixing a defense system project after the prior engineer falsified results to make it seem viable. Meanwhile, Jim becomes caught up in literary and academic interests, drugs, parties and casual sex. Attempting to find meaning in his life, he gets involved with an anti-weapons-industry terrorist group. The narratives collide when this group plans a hit on LSR. Unbeknownst to them, LSR is aware of their activities and open themselves up for attack, with the goal of using it to hide their program's failures and recover their investment via insurance. At the last moment, Jim balks on the attack, with the unintended effect of causing his father to lose his job. At the end of the novel, both Dennis and Jim rediscover the outdoor life, as both try to piece their lives back together.

The Gold Coast was nominated for the Campbell, Locus, and British Science Fiction award in 1989.

Pacific Edge
Pacific Edge (1990) can be compared to Ernest Callenbach's Ecotopia, and also to Ursula K. Le Guin's The Dispossessed. This book's Californian future is set in the El Modena neighborhood of Orange in 2065. It depicts a realistic utopia as it describes a possible transformation process from our present status, to a more ecologically-focused future. The book does not assume a blank slate from which ecological utopia can be erected, but assumes the buildings, cities and infrastructures of our past and present. An important aspect of the book is the way these are changed to become "green". Pacific Edge is also realistic insofar as conflicts about diverging interests play a big role. In 2065, these are mainly conflicts between Greens and New Federals as the main political parties that are the A.A.M.T. using small companies to buy the last piece of wilderness in the area and develop it; but also conflicts on the personal scale, for example, Kevin, the main character builds a romantic relationship with the mayor's former lover. From a literary critique point of view the broad descriptions of nature and landscape are of interest, as well as the self-references in regard to writing about utopian futures versus actual political work.  Pacific Edge was the winner of the John W. Campbell Memorial Award in 1991.

Pacific Edge narrates a summer in the life of Kevin Clayborne, a young house renovator recently elected for the town council of El Modena. Kevin finds himself at odds with the town mayor, Alfredo Blair, both personally and professionally. On the personal side, Alfredo's former long-term girlfriend Ramona Alvarez who just broke up with him, and both Kevin and Alfredo are vying for her affection. On the professional side, Alfredo has been influenced by corporate money and attempts to rezone the last virgin hill inside the town for a commercial development. Kevin loses in all accounts: After attempting a relationship with Kevin, Ramona comes back to Alfredo, and the rezoning of the hill is passed by the council and by a town vote. In a last attempt to save the hill, Kevin turns it into a memorial for his recently deceased grandfather, who was a pillar of the community, and this makes the commercial development on the hill an unpalatable project for the town. At the end of the novel, Kevin attends Ramona and Alfredo's wedding, and mourns what he's lost and reflects on what he's achieved.

These books, especially Pacific Edge, can be seen as forerunners to Robinson's Mars trilogy.

Development history
In an interview with UCSD, Robinson said that "this was one of my few original ideas." And he came up with the idea for the novels while still at UCSD on a drive from UCSD to Orange County, California to visit his parents.

References

External links

 The Orange County trilogy at KimStanleyRobinson.info

1984 American novels
1988 American novels
1990 American novels
Fiction set in 1987
Fiction set in 2027
Fiction set in 2065
Debut speculative fiction novels
Novel series
Environmental fiction books
Novels by Kim Stanley Robinson
Novels set in the 2020s
Novels set in the 2060s
Novels set in Orange County, California
Dystopian novels
1990 debut novels
American post-apocalyptic novels
El Modena, Orange, California